Seeb (sometimes stylized as SEEB or SeeB) is a Norwegian EDM record production duo made up of Simen Eriksrud and Espen Berg. Their name is made up of the initials (first letter of given name and surname) of the original duo.

Career

Beginnings
Before adopting the name Seeb, Eriksrud and Berg worked together as producers and songwriters for several Norwegian acts including Bertine Zetlitz, D'Sound and Donkeyboy, mostly under the name Simen & Espen. They also produced and co-wrote a track on Kiesza's breakthrough album Sound of a Woman.

2015–present: Breakthrough, Intro to Seeb and Nice to Meet You
The duo's major international success was for their remix of the song "I Took a Pill in Ibiza" by American singer Mike Posner. The remixed single was released on 24 July 2015. It topped the charts in the Netherlands, Norway, Ireland and the United Kingdom, and peaked within the top ten of the charts in Denmark, Finland, New Zealand, Sweden, Switzerland, and Posner's native United States.

Seeb released their debut single "Breathe" on 11 March 2016, featuring Portuguese singer Neev. "What Do You Love", featuring Jacob Banks, was released on 14 October 2016. Both songs are featured on their debut EP Intro to Seeb. On 3 March 2017, they released "Under Your Skin", a collaboration with American duo Rock City and Chloe Angelides. Featuring Greg Holden, "Boys in the Street" was released on 2 June 2017. "Rich Love", a collaboration with American pop rock band OneRepublic, was released on 14 July 2017. "Cruel World", a collaboration with Skip Marley, was released on 10 November 2017. They collaborated also with Ocean Park Standoff on the single "Lost Boys (Ocean Park Standoff vs Seeb)", released on 2 February 2018.

On 28 March 2018, the trio announced the release of their second EP Nice to Meet You, released on 20 April 2018. The lead single of their EP, titled "Drink About" and featuring Dagny, was released on 6 April 2018.

On 6 December 2018, Seeb released the single "Grip", a collaboration with Bastille.

On 4 April 2019, Seeb released 'Free To Go', featuring Ingrid Helene Håvik of Highasakite. Followed by 'Fade Out' released on 15 May 2019 featuring Olivia O'Brien. Seeb have since released tracks with Justin Jesso, Julie Bergan and American Authors, and remixed tracks for 5 Seconds of Summer and Charli XCX.

In February 2020 Seeb were nominated for the "Pop Group of the Year Award" at the Norwegian equivalent of the Grammy Awards, Spellemannprisen; however the Award Ceremony has been postponed due to the COVID-19 outbreak. They also remixed the song "Hallucinogenics" by Matt Maeson.

Discography

 Sad in Scandinavia (2021)

Awards and nominations

References

External links
 

Norwegian record producers
Norwegian musical duos
Remixers
Tropical house musicians
Electronic dance music duos